Saana Svärd (born 1977) is a Finnish Assyriologist, serving since 2018 as Associate Professor of Ancient Near Eastern Studies in the Faculty of Arts and the University of Helsinki. She is known as an expert on the cultural history of the ancient Near East, most notably the Neo-Assyrian Empire, social and political power relations, and ancient concepts of gender, but also in the field of language technology and digital humanities. Most recently, in 2017, she wrote together with Charles Halton the anthology Women's Writing of Ancient Mesopotamia: An Anthology of the Earliest Female Author (Cambridge University Press).

Biography 
Svärd received her Ph.D. from the University of Helsinki in 2012 and is a docent of Assyriology in that same university and a docent in Cultural History of the Near East at the University of Turku. She has held visiting research positions at the University of California, Berkeley, the University of Tartu, the University of Innsbruck, Chuo University (Tokyo) and the University of Malta. She is a member of the Centre of Excellence in Changes in Sacred Texts and Traditions (director: Martti Nissinen), and a member of the Academy Project Semantic Domains in Akkadian Texts (director: Krister Lindén).

Since 2018, Svärd is the director of the Academy of Finland Centre of Excellence in Ancient Near Eastern Empires, an interdisciplinary research centre at the University of Helsinki that focuses on how changing imperial dynamics through the periods of Neo-Assyrian, Neo-Babylonian, Persian, Hellenistic, and early Roman/Parthian control impact social group identities and lifeways during the first millennium BCE.

Books 
 Women and power in Neo-Assyrian palaces. State Archives of Assyria Studies 23. Winona Lake: Eisenbrauns, 2015.
 (with Charles Halton) Women's writing of ancient Mesopotamia: an anthology of the earliest female authors. Cambridge: Cambridge University Press, 2017.

References 

Finnish Assyriologists
Academic staff of the University of Helsinki
1977 births
Living people
Assyriologists